Angela Gots is an American actress, best known for her roles in Molly's Game and Madam Secretary.

Early life
Gots was born and raised in New York City. She attended Rodeph Shalom School.

Filmography

Film

Television

Video games

References

External links

1983 births
Living people
American actresses
21st-century American women